Metro Trains Melbourne, often known simply as Metro, is the operator of services on the electrified suburban passenger rail network in Melbourne, Victoria, Australia. It is owned by Public Transport Victoria who sublet the infrastructure and rolling stock of Metro Trains Melbourne to a joint venture between Hong Kong-based MTR Corporation (60%), John Holland Group (20%) and UGL Rail (20%). The three constituent companies are also partners in the Metro Trains Sydney joint venture, which has operated the Sydney Metro network since 2019.

There are sixteen regular service rail lines and one special events railway line. Metro Trains Melbourne is also responsible for 219 railway stations and employs a workforce of 3,500 rail professionals including train drivers, mechanical and electrical engineers, network operations specialists and customer service representatives.

The railway track, infrastructure and rolling stock is owned by VicTrack on behalf of the State Government, and is leased to Public Transport Victoria which then sub-leases them to Metro Trains Melbourne. The State Government now also owns the name 'Metro,' and it will likely stay even if there is a change of operators. Metro Trains has faced criticism in the past and was voted the worst rail system in Australia in 2011. However, the operation, punctuality and consistency of the network has greatly improved since 2014 with level crossing removals, target benchmarks for trains and more frequent trains.

History

Metro Trains Melbourne was selected as the new operator by the Government of Victoria through its relevant agency, the Director of Public Transport, in June 2009 and replaced the previous operator, Connex Melbourne, on 30 November 2009. It was awarded an eight-year contract with the option of being extended for a further seven years. On 2 April 2012, the newly created Public Transport Victoria took over the management of the contract from the Director of Public Transport.

In September 2016, a contract extension until November 2024 was announced. It was later extended until May 2026.

In July 2017, Metro experienced a computer outage which resulted in 224 services being cancelled, and 378 services running late. Metro was fined a total of $1.2 million and was forced to reimburse $620,000 to the customers affected.

Rolling stock 

The majority of rolling stock is owned by the Victorian Government business enterprise VicTrack. Metro Trains Melbourne is responsible for maintaining the train fleet. All trains on the Melbourne suburban network are electric, operated by drivers, and fitted with power-operated sliding doors which are closed by the driver, but opened by passengers. The doors of newer model X'Trapolis 100 and Siemens trains are opened by a button, but the Comeng trains are opened using handles. Trains also have inter-car doors to enable passengers to change carriages while in transit. All trains are fitted with air conditioning, closed-circuit cameras, and emergency intercom systems. Trains are fixed into three car units, and may operate alone or in pairs.

As part of the 2008 Victorian Transport Plan, 38 six-car X'Trapolis EMUs were ordered, with the first of 19 trains built by Alstom in Italy arriving at the Newport Workshops on 24 August 2009. The trains were assembled at United Group's Ballarat North Workshops, under a state government requirement for a minimum of 40% local content. Further orders of X'Trapolis saw the fleet total 212 3-car or 106 6-car sets by the time the final sets entered service in 2020.

In September 2016, Evolution Rail (a consortium of Downer Rail, Changchun Railway Vehicles and Plenary Group) was selected to build 65 new High Capacity Metro Trains for delivery from 2019.

In May 2021, an order of 25 X'Trapolis 2.0 trains was confirmed by the Victorian Government in the lead up to the 2021/22 election. The trains will run first on the Craigieburn, Frankston and Upfield lines and are expected to enter service between 2024 and 2026. These trains have been ordered to allow the retirement of the 40 year old Comeng Trains. In 2022, scrapping began on the oldest of the Comeng Trains after the withdrawal of a series of Comeng Sets. The Pakenham and Cranbourne line is set to be entirely ran by HCMT trains by the end of 2022, followed by the Sunbury line in 2026. With the introduction of X'trapolis 2.0s expected to occur at that time, all Comeng Trains will be retired.

Passenger trains

Future Fleet

Maintenance trains

Former Fleet

Classification and configuration 

Since shortly after the introduction of suburban electric trains in Melbourne, their carriages have been classified as follows. All fleet types have used these classifications, with different fleet types using different number ranges for the carriages.

 M indicates a motorised carriage, with a driving compartment.
 T indicates a trailer carriage.
 D indicated a trailer carriage with a driving compartment. Only Swing-door, Tait, and Hitachi trains had these.
 G indicated a trailer carriage fitted with both electric and gas lighting, for use on both suburban and country services. Only Tait trains had these.
 BT indicated a second class trailer carriage. Only Swing-door and Harris trains had these. Prior to the abolition of first class suburban travel in 1958, motor carriages were second class and trailer carriages were first class (except for some DogBox carriages).

An exception to the above classifications was the trial double-deck train, which used T to indicate a trailer carriage with a driving compartment, and M to indicate a motorised carriage without a driving compartment.

Currently, all trains except for the HCMT stock are assembled into a symmetrical M-T-M arrangement. Trains comprise either one or two such units. All peak period services and some off-peak services comprise two units. The Hitachi trains, retired in 2014, operated in fixed two-unit sets.

Services and lines

Melbourne uses "clock-face" timetables in off-peak periods, but generally not in peak periods, due to operating near to the capacity of the infrastructure and having to accommodate single-line sections, flat junctions, and regional diesel-hauled trains. Even in off-peak periods, however, frequencies vary according to time of day and day of week, and by line. In some places, services on two lines combine to provide more frequent services on common sections of tracks. Saturday and Sunday services are identical during the day, but differ during the evening on some lines. Sunday morning services however start later than on Saturdays, and run less frequently until around 10am.

Metro Trains Melbourne operates several passenger rail lines and one special events railway line, with travel patterns grouped as follows.

Burnley Group 

 

Lilydale and Belgrave trains operate via the City Loop, running anticlockwise on weekday mornings, and clockwise on weekday afternoons and weekends. During peak hours, some trains run express in the direction of peak travel using the third track from Box Hill.

Glen Waverley trains run direct to and from Flinders Street on weekday mornings. On weekday afternoons and weekends, Glen Waverley trains operate clockwise via the Loop, with Belgrave and Lilydale services.

Alamein trains operate anticlockwise via the Loop during weekday morning peak, anticlockwise during weekday afternoon peak and weekends, and operate as shuttles to and from Camberwell during weekday off peak.

Caulfield Group 
 

From 31 January 2021, all trains operate via the City Loop in an anti-clockwise direction from Richmond station on weekdays and weekends.

Clifton Hill Group 
 

From 1 January 2018, all trains (with the exception of those departing the city after midnight, all services after midnight run direct from Flinders Street) operate via the City Loop (in a clockwise direction from Jolimont station on weekdays and weekends

On most occasions in peak hour, Hurstbridge line trains operate express between Jolimont and Clifton Hill, with the Mernda trains serving the intermediate stations.

Northern Group 
 

All trains operate via the City Loop (in one direction depending on the time of day and day of week), except for the Williamstown services. All off-peak Williamstown services are shuttles to and from the junction at Newport, while in peak they run direct from Flinders Street. Since 9 November 2008, Werribee trains do not run through the Loop during morning and afternoon peaks.

Since 2011, Williamstown services do not use the Northern loop at all, instead being directed onto the Frankston line as part of the Cross-City group. Werribee trains still used the loop on weekends (apart from Night Network services) until late January 2021.

Cross-City Group
 
From 31 January 2021, Frankston line trains will run from Richmond direct to Flinders Street without travelling through the City Loop. The Frankston line train will run through Flinders Street to connect the Werribee and Williamstown line trains removed from the City Loop. 7-days a week all trains operated direct to and from Flinders Street will not travel through the Loop.

During Weekday Peak hour times the Werribee line train will run express between Laverton and North Melbourne by stopping at Newport and Footscray within 40 minute journey time. The Frankston line train runs express between Cheltenham and South Yarra by stopping at Caulfield, city bound trains by stopping at Malvern first then express to South Yarra.

Stony Point line
  (non-electrified shuttle beyond Frankston)
Stony Point line services operate as shuttles from Frankston station with passengers to and from Flinders Street required to change trains. It is the only non-electrified line operated by Metro Trains, with services being operated using Sprinter diesel multiple units leased from V/Line.

Sandringham line 
 
From 31 January 2021, Sandringham Line services stopped using the City Loop, with all trains operated from Richmond direct to and from Flinders Street 7-days a week.

Special services 
  (special event service)
There are no regularly scheduled services on the Flemington Racecourse line, but services are run to the Racecourse whenever race meetings are held at the racecourse. Services are operated to the Showgrounds platform during the Royal Melbourne Show every September, as well as during large events such as University Examinations. Flemington Line services can also be run on occasions of closures on the Craigieburn Line. During the Buckley Street Level Crossing Removal in 2018, replacement buses to Craigieburn departed Flemington Racecourse railway station.

Stations 

Metro Trains Melbourne are responsible for the day-to-day operations of 219 stations. Metropolitan railway stations include: terminus stations, premium stations staffed from first to last train (and all night during Night Network, except the underground city loop stations and Southern Cross stations, which close between 00.30-01:00) who provide extra assistance and information to commuters, and host stations that are staffed primarily between 07:00 to 9:30 for the morning peak, although some stations are staffed for an extended morning peak between 06:30 to 10:00.

Ticketing

Metro Trains Melbourne uses the myki ticketing system exclusively. Myki is a time and zone based ticketing system, with validity periods ranging from two hours to one year, and two zones covering the Melbourne metropolitan area.

The Metcard ticketing system was decommissioned on 28 December 2012.

Fare enforcement
Like the other modes of public transport in Victoria, Metro Trains Melbourne employs Authorised Officers (commonly known as "ticket inspectors") who exercise powers under the Transport (Compliance and Miscellaneous) Act 1983. The main responsibilities of Authorised Officers are to report ticketing and behavioural offences to the Victorian Department of Transport, provide customer information and help during special events.

Authorised Officers are authorised by the Director of Public Transport to exercise powers similar to those of police, allowing them to check tickets and verify concession entitlements. In some circumstances, Authorised Officers may also perform arrests when aboard other vehicles operating under PTV or when on Department of Transport-owned premises, such as railway stations or train tracks.

Authorised Officers are required to adhere to the Code of Conduct for Public Transport Authorised Officers. and violations of this code are prosecuted. The Code of Conduct states that an Authorised Officer may use discretion when reporting an alleged offender, and must supply their name and work address when asked. If an Authorised Officer believes that a passenger has committed an offence, they have the right to request the offender's name and address after having explained the nature of the alleged offence to the offender. The Authorised Officer also have the right to request proof of the given information. If the offender refuses to provide identification or provides false information, Authorised Officers will then contact Victoria Police. Authorised Officers also have the right to detain the offender until the police or further assistance arrives.

Authorised Officers are required to submit a Report of non-compliance with the details, specific nature and circumstances of the offence to the Department of Transport, who then processes the reports and decide upon any penalties. Any fines levied are payable to the Department, not to Metro Trains Melbourne. Metro Trains Melbourne receives a small administration fee to cover the costs associated with employing Authorised Officers.

Punctuality

Metro failed to meet Government set targets for punctuality in all of its first 9 months in operation, with almost 1 in 4 trains being late.

Metro's performance improved in 2011,  exceeding performance benchmarks for six consecutive months from June to November the first time this had been achieved since December 2008. Since April 2012, the punctuality figures have been consistently outperforming the benchmark, while the delivery figures have either exceeded or were very close to the benchmark throughout 2012 and 2013.

Metro is often criticised for meeting its punctuality benchmarks by skipping stations - most commonly the city loop - effectively only delivering a partial service.

More recently, large scale infrastructure projects such as Level Crossing Removal, and signalling upgrades have worked to improve the reliablility and punctuality of the network.

Legislation & governance

Transport Integration Act

The prime transport-related statute in Victoria is the Transport Integration Act 2010. The Act established the Department of Transport as the integration agency for Victoria's transport system. The Act also establishes and sets the charters of the State agencies charged with providing public transport rail services and managing network access for freight services, namely the Director of Public Transport and V/Line. The Act authorises the Director of Public Transport to enter into contracts for the provision of transport services and this provision is the source of the power for the contract between Metro and the Director. In addition, the Transport Integration Act establishes VicTrack which owns the public rail network and associated infrastructure. VicTrack leases public transport land and infrastructure to the Director of Public Transport who leases it to transport operators such as Metro as well as entering into franchise agreements with the operators for them to run public transport services on behalf of the State.

Rail Safety Act

The safety of rail transport operations in Melbourne is regulated by the Rail Safety Act 2006 which applies to all commercial passenger operations. The Act establishes a framework containing safety duties for all rail industry participants and requires operators who manage infrastructure and rolling stock to obtain accreditation prior to commencing operations. Accredited operators are also required to have a safety management system to guide their operations. Sanctions applying to the safety scheme established under the Rail Safety Act are contained in the Transport (Compliance and Miscellaneous) Act 1983. The safety regulator for the rail system in Melbourne including trams is the Director, Transport Safety (trading as Transport Safety Victoria) whose office is established under the Transport Integration Act 2010. No blame investigations for rail matters are undertaken by the Chief Investigator, Transport Safety.

Ticketing and conduct

Ticketing requirements for trains, trams and buses in Melbourne are mainly contained in the Transport (Ticketing) Regulations 2006 and the Victorian Fares and Ticketing Manual. Rules about safe and fair conduct on trains, trams and buses in Melbourne are generally contained in the Transport (Compliance and Miscellaneous) Act 1983 and the Transport (Conduct) Regulations 2005.

Criticism and controversy

May 2011 timetable changes
Metro Trains updated the running schedules in May 2011 to alleviate late running (and thus penalties). In reality, in many cases services were simply given a few more minutes per trip to offset any late running. In some instances, some trains are required to wait at stations mid-journey to return to schedule. Many passengers criticised this move, with some saying that effort should be placed on upgrading infrastructure to allow more efficient operation rather than padding timetables to suit the operator.

Since implementing this timetable Metro Trains have reached punctuality targets each month, and have not been required to compensate eligible passengers. The only exception to this has been May 2011, the first month of operation.

Twitter
In January 2012 Metro Trains ceased using its official Twitter feed to advise of train service cancellations and disruptions, instead choosing to provide only major disruptions, planned alterations to services and other announcements. Users seeking up-to-date service information were directed to use the Metro Trains website instead. This move provoked outrage from customers, many of whom considered the Twitter feed to be a more accessible source of information and saw the current tweets to be nothing other than carefully worded spin. They have since resumed using their Twitter feed for service updates.

Station skipping and early service terminations
In April 2012, Metro Trains acknowledged the practice of altering stopping condition of selected late-running trains (for example, stopping all station to express) in an attempt to make up lost time (thus meeting the Operational Performance Regime set by the State Government of Victoria). It has also been reported that selected services have terminated (turnaround) ahead of their timetabled destination, forcing passengers to change services mid-journey. Metro Trains make these changes throughout the day, including in peak hours, claiming it is for the greater good, however this can inconvenience outer suburban passengers who must then wait up to an hour between services. These come after Metro Trains failed to meet punctuality targets in February and March 2012. It has been reported that the incidence of altered services has become more frequent since the introduction of the network wide new timetables on 22 April. Reportedly, at least 129 drivers' incident reports from mid-April to May record services that have been altered in the form of changing a stopping-all-stations to express or terminating a service early.

In June 2012, Metro was fined $2.7 million for January to March 2012 quarter for service performance, including skipping stations, running shorter services and bypassing City Loop stations. "... but too often it had resorted to running short services or bypassing the City Loop to keep to the timetable." as stated by Public Transport Victoria chief executive Ian Dobbs.

Safety checks
In May 2012, Australian Rail Tram and Bus Industry Union accused Metro Trains taking shortcuts in safety procedures, including not checking on-board CCTV and intercoms, and allow trains with cracked inner glass to take passengers. Metro Trains claim safety equipment is regularly checked during routine maintenance.

Live service update not showing cancelled trains
On 16 July 2012, Metro Trains launched a revamped website which included a healthboard that displayed live information about train delays and disruptions, both planned and unplanned. However, details of cancelled services were removed. Metro Trains stated that such information was still available via SMS alerts, however the number of people subscribed to the alerts plunged 60% in six months (13,000 subscribers in mid-2012 when compared to 32,000 at beginning of 2012) due to a growing preference for people to use smartphones.

State Government concerned on station skipping to meet target
A ministerial document shows the State Government raised concerns that some station skipping may not be warranted. "There have been some instances where the decision appears to be not in the best interest of commuters ...". "The train driver's union, Public Transport Users Association and the Opposition are calling for Metro's bonuses (worth $3.38 million last year) to be scrapped if achieved by shortcuts ... Rail, Tram and Bus Union locomotive secretary Marc Marotta said station skipping had gone from an emergency practice to a daily practice under Metro, with Frankston and Craigieburn lines the worst affected." In summary: 59 stations were skipped 3 or more times a week between 22 April 2012 and 10 October 2012; an Alamein train which skipped Glenferrie when it was a mere three minutes late; 1998 (or 0.46% of monthly trains) have altered to express since September 2012; 9 drivers have complained about passenger abuse.

Customer compensation streamlining
It was reported in 2013 that tens of thousands of passengers were missing out on compensation when Metro failed to meet monthly performance targets, either because they were not aware of their entitlements or didn't want the hassle of going through the complicated claims system. In 2012, 300,000 passengers were eligible for compensation but did not make claims. Therefore, Metro only paid out 12,000 claims worth $99,000 instead of at least $1.3 million.

July 2017 shutdown
On 13 July 2017, a computer glitch occurred that left Melbourne's rail network temporarily disabled. During the computer glitch, Metro's website also seemed to be experiencing technical issues. On the next morning Metro Trains chief Mike Haughton said, "A failure in the core train control system had meant operators could not see the trains, so it was shut down for safety reasons."

Satisfaction Survey
A 2016 study by Canstar Blue revealed that customers rated Metro as the worst metropolitan train service in Australia, with a rating of three stars compared to four stars in all other capital cities. The same survey also revealed 53% of Metro's customers "often experienced delays" (compared to 15% - 40% of passengers in other capital cities) while 70% experienced overcrowding. Melbourne/Metro also had the lowest customer ratings for safety, cleanliness and the ticketing system.

Dumb Ways to Die

In November 2012, Metro launched the safety campaign Dumb Ways to Die which became a global viral video hit through sharing and social media. It also produced merchandise such as posters, stickers and badges. The campaign was leaked to the public several days early by the Fake Metro Trains parody Twitter account.

In May 2013, Metro released a "Dumb Ways to Die" game as an app for iPhone, iPod touch and iPad devices. The game invites players to avoid the dangerous activities engaged in by the various characters featured throughout the campaign. Within the app, players can also pledge to "not do dumb stuff around trains". In November 2014, Metro released a sequel, "Dumb Ways to Die 2: the Games" which follows a similar premise as the first game in a style of various sporting events and also allows players to pledge.

References

External links
 Metro Trains Melbourne
PTV Website
Department of Transport VIC

MTR Corporation
Passenger railway companies of Australia
Public transport in Melbourne
Railway companies established in 2009
Railway infrastructure companies of Australia
Rail transport in Victoria (Australia)
Rail transport in Melbourne
Australian companies established in 2009
Multinational joint-venture companies